Ancient Greek literature is literature written in the Ancient Greek language from the earliest texts until the time of the Byzantine Empire. The earliest surviving works of ancient Greek literature, dating back to the early Archaic period, are the two epic poems the Iliad and the Odyssey, set in an idealized archaic past today identified as having some relation to the Mycenaean era. These two epics, along with the Homeric Hymns and the two poems of Hesiod, Theogony and Works and Days, constituted the major foundations of the Greek literary tradition that would continue into the Classical, Hellenistic, and Roman periods.

The lyric poets Sappho, Alcaeus, and Pindar were highly influential during the early development of the Greek poetic tradition. Aeschylus is the earliest Greek tragic playwright for whom any plays have survived complete. Sophocles is famous for his tragedies about Oedipus, particularly Oedipus the King and Antigone. Euripides is known for his plays which often pushed the boundaries of the tragic genre. The comedic playwright Aristophanes wrote in the genre of Old Comedy, while the later playwright Menander was an early pioneer of New Comedy. The historians Herodotus of Halicarnassus and Thucydides, who both lived during the fifth century BC, wrote accounts of events that happened shortly before and during their own lifetimes. The philosopher Plato wrote dialogues, usually centered around his teacher Socrates, dealing with various philosophical subjects, whereas his student Aristotle wrote numerous treatises, which later became highly influential.

Important later writers included Apollonius of Rhodes, who wrote The Argonautica, an epic poem about the voyage of the Argonauts; Archimedes, who wrote groundbreaking mathematical treatises; and Plutarch, who wrote mainly biographies and essays. The second-century AD writer Lucian of Samosata was a Greek, who wrote primarily works of satire. Ancient Greek literature has had a profound impact on later Greek literature and also western literature at large. In particular, many ancient Roman authors drew inspiration from their Greek predecessors. Ever since the Renaissance, European authors in general, including Dante Alighieri, William Shakespeare, John Milton, and James Joyce, have all drawn heavily on classical themes and motifs.

Pre-classical and classical antiquity 

This period of Greek literature stretches from Homer until the fourth century BC and the rise of Alexander the Great. The earliest known Greek writings are Mycenaean, written in the Linear B syllabary on clay tablets. These documents contain prosaic records largely concerned with trade (lists, inventories, receipts, etc.); no real literature has been discovered. Michael Ventris and John Chadwick, the original decipherers of Linear B, state that literature almost certainly existed in Mycenaean Greece, but it was either not written down or, if it was, it was on parchment or wooden tablets, which did not survive the destruction of the Mycenaean palaces in the twelfth century BC.

Greek literature was divided in well-defined literary genres, each one having a compulsory formal structure, about both dialect and metrics. The first division was between prose and poetry. Within poetry there were three super-genres: epic, lyric and drama. The common European terminology about literary genres is directly derived from the ancient Greek terminology. Lyric and drama were further divided into more genres: lyric in four (elegiac, iambic, monodic lyric and choral lyric); drama in three (tragedy, comedy and pastoral drama). Prose literature can largely be said to begin with Herodotus. Over time, several genres of prose literature developed, but the distinctions between them were frequently blurred.

Epic poetry 
At the beginning of Greek literature stand the two monumental works of Homer, the Iliad and the Odyssey. The figure of Homer is shrouded in mystery. Although the works as they now stand are credited to him, it is certain that their roots reach far back before his time (see Homeric Question). The Iliad is a narrative of a single episode spanning over the course of a ten-day-period from near the end of the ten years of the Trojan War. It centers on the person of Achilles, who embodied the Greek heroic ideal.

The Odyssey is an account of the adventures of Odysseus, one of the warriors at Troy. After ten years fighting the war, he spends another ten years sailing back home to his wife and family. Penelope was considered the ideal female; Homer depicted her as the ideal female based on her commitment, modesty, purity, and respect during her marriage with Odysseus. During his ten-year voyage, he loses all of his comrades and ships and makes his way home to Ithaca disguised as a beggar. Both of these works were based on ancient legends. The Homeric dialect was an archaic language based on Ionic dialect mixed with some element of Aeolic dialect and Attic dialect, the latter due to the Athenian edition of the 6th century BC. The epic verse was the hexameter.

The other great poet of the preclassical period was Hesiod. Unlike Homer, Hesiod refers to himself in his poetry. Nonetheless, nothing is known about him from any external source. He was a native of Boeotia in central Greece, and is thought to have lived and worked around 700 BC. Hesiod's two extant poems are Works and Days and Theogony. Works and Days is a faithful depiction of the poverty-stricken country life he knew so well, and it sets forth principles and rules for farmers. Theogony is a systematic account of creation and of the gods. It vividly describes the ages of mankind, beginning with a long-past Golden Age.

The writings of Homer and Hesiod were held in extremely high regard throughout antiquity and were viewed by many ancient authors as the foundational texts behind ancient Greek religion; Homer told the story of a heroic past, which Hesiod bracketed with a creation narrative and an account of the practical realities of contemporary daily life.

Lyric poetry 

Lyric poetry received its name from the fact that it was originally sung by individuals or a chorus accompanied by the instrument called the lyre. Despite the name, the lyric poetry in this general meaning was divided in four genres, two of which were not accompanied by cithara, but by flute. These two latter genres were elegiac poetry and iambic poetry. Both were written in the Ionic dialect. Elegiac poems were written in elegiac couplets and iambic poems were written in iambic trimeter. The first of the lyric poets was probably Archilochus of Paros, 7th century BC, the most important iambic poet. Only fragments remain of his work, as is the case with most of the poets. The few remnants suggest that he was an embittered adventurer who led a very turbulent life.

Many lyric poems were written in the Aeolic dialect. Lyric poems often employed highly varied poetic meters. The most famous of all lyric poets were the so-called "Nine Lyric Poets". Of all the lyric poets, Sappho of Lesbos (c. 630 – c. 570 BC) was by far the most widely revered. In antiquity, her poems were regarded with the same degree of respect as the poems of Homer. Only one of her poems, "Ode to Aphrodite", has survived to the present day in its original, completed form. In addition to Sappho, her contemporary Alcaeus of Lesbos was also notable for monodic lyric poetry. The poetry written by Alcman was considered beautiful, even though he wrote exclusively in the Doric dialect, which was normally considered unpleasant to hear. The later poet Pindar of Thebes was renowned for his choral lyric poetry.

Drama 

All surviving works of Greek drama were composed by playwrights from Athens and are written exclusively in the Attic dialect. Choral performances were a common tradition in all Greek city-states. The Athenians credited a man named Thespis with having invented drama by introducing the first actor, whose primary purpose was to interact with the leader of the chorus. Later playwrights expanded the number of actors to three, allowing for greater freedom in storytelling.

In the age that followed the Greco-Persian Wars, the awakened national spirit of Athens was expressed in hundreds of tragedies based on heroic and legendary themes of the past. The tragic plays grew out of simple choral songs and dialogues performed at festivals of the god Dionysus. In the classical period, performances included three tragedies and one pastoral drama, depicting four different episodes of the same myth. Wealthy citizens were chosen to bear the expense of costuming and training the chorus as a public and religious duty. Attendance at the festival performances was regarded as an act of worship. Performances were held in the great open-air theater of Dionysus in Athens. The poets competed for the prizes offered for the best plays.

All fully surviving Greek tragedies are conventionally attributed to Aeschylus, Sophocles or Euripides. The authorship of Prometheus Bound, which is traditionally attributed to Aeschylus, and Rhesus, which is traditionally attributed to Euripides, are, however, questioned. There are seven surviving tragedies attributed to Aeschylus. Three of these plays, Agamemnon, The Libation-Bearers, and The Eumenides, form a trilogy known as the Oresteia. One of these plays, Prometheus Bound, however, may actually be the work of Aeschylus's son Euphorion.

Seven works of Sophocles have survived, the most acclaimed of which are the three Theban plays, which center around the story of Oedipus and his offspring. The Theban Trilogy consists of Oedipus the King, Oedipus at Colonus, and Antigone. Although the plays are often called a "trilogy," they were actually written many years apart. Antigone, the last of the three plays sequentially, was actually first to be written, having been composed in 441 BC, towards the beginning of Sophocles's career. Oedipus the King, the most famous of the three, was written around 429 BC at the midpoint of Sophocles's career. Oedipus at Colonus, the second of the three plays chronologically, was actually Sophocles's last play and was performed in 401 BC, after Sophocles's death.

There are nineteen surviving plays attributed to Euripides. The most well-known of these plays are Medea, Hippolytus, and Bacchae. Rhesus is sometimes thought to have been written by Euripides' son, or to have been a posthumous reproduction of a play by Euripides. Euripides pushed the limits of the tragic genre and many of the elements in his plays were more typical of comedy than tragedy. His play Alcestis, for instance, has often been categorized as a "problem play" or perhaps even as a work of tragicomedy rather than a true tragedy due to its comedic elements and the fact that it has a happy ending.

Like tragedy, comedy arose from a ritual in honor of Dionysus, but in this case the plays were full of frank obscenity, abuse, and insult. At Athens, the comedies became an official part of the festival celebration in 486 BC, and prizes were offered for the best productions. As with the tragedians, few works still remain of the great comedic writers. The only complete surviving works of classical comedy are eleven plays written by the playwright Aristophanes. These are a treasure trove of comic presentation. He poked fun at everyone and every institution. In The Birds, he ridicules Athenian democracy. In The Clouds, he attacks the philosopher Socrates. In Lysistrata, he denounces war. Aristophanes has been praised highly for his dramatic skill and artistry. John Lemprière's Bibliotheca Classica describes him as, quite simply, "the greatest comic dramatist in world literature: by his side Molière seems dull and Shakespeare clownish." Of all Aristophanes's plays, however, the one that has received the most lasting recognition is The Frogs, which simultaneously satirizes and immortalizes the two giants of Athenian tragedy: Aeschylus and Euripides. When it was performed for the first time at the Lenaia Festival in 405 BC, just one year after the death of Euripides, the Athenians awarded it first prize. It was the only Greek play that was ever given an encore performance, which took place two months later at the City Dionysia. Even today, The Frogs still appeals to modern audiences. A commercially successful modern musical adaptation of it was performed on Broadway in 2004.

The third dramatic genre was the satyr play. Although the genre was popular, only one complete example of a satyr play has survived: Cyclops by Euripides. Large portions of a second satyr play, Ichneutae by Sophocles, have been recovered from the site of Oxyrhynchus in Egypt among the Oxyrhynchus Papyri.

Historiography 

Two notable historians who lived during the Classical Era were Herodotus of Halicarnassus and Thucydides. Herodotus is commonly called "The Father of History." His book The Histories is among the oldest works of prose literature in existence. Thucydides's book History of the Peloponnesian War greatly influenced later writers and historians, including the author of the book of Acts of the Apostles and the Byzantine Era historian Procopius of Caesarea.

A third historian of ancient Greece, Xenophon of Athens, began his Hellenica  where Thucydides ended his work about 411 BC and carried his history to 362 BC. Xenophon's most famous work is his book The Anabasis, a detailed, first-hand account of his participation in a Greek mercenary army that tried to help the Persian Cyrus expel his brother from the throne, another famous work relating to Persian history is his Cyropaedia. Xenophon also wrote three works in praise of the philosopher Socrates: The Apology of Socrates to the Jury, The Symposium, and Memorabilia. Although both Xenophon and Plato knew Socrates, their accounts are very different. Many comparisons have been made between the account of the military historian and the account of the poet-philosopher.

Philosophy 

Many important and influential philosophers lived during the fifth and fourth centuries BC. Among the earliest Greek philosophers were the three so-called "Milesian philosophers": Thales of Miletus, Anaximander, and Anaximenes. Of these philosophers' writings, however, only one fragment from Anaximander preserved by Simplicius of Cilicia has survived.

Very little is known for certain about the life of the philosopher Pythagoras of Samos and no writings by him have survived to the present day, but an impressive corpus of poetic writings written by his pupil Empedocles of Acragas has survived, making Empedocles one of the most widely attested Pre-Socratic philosophers. A large number of fragments written by the philosophers Heraclitus of Ephesus and Democritus of Abdera have also survived.

Of all the classical philosophers, however, Socrates, Plato, and Aristotle are generally considered the most important and influential. Socrates did not write any books himself and modern scholars debate whether or not Plato's portrayal of him is accurate. Some scholars contend that many of his ideas, or at least a vague approximation of them, are expressed in Plato's early socratic dialogues. Meanwhile, other scholars have argued that Plato's portrayal of Socrates is merely a fictional representation intended to expound Plato's own opinions who has very little to do with the historical figure of the same name. The debate over the extent to which Plato's portrayal of Socrates represents the actual Socrates's ideas is known as the Socratic problem.

Plato expressed his ideas through dialogues, that is, written works purporting to describe conversations between different individuals. Some of the best-known of these include: The Apology of Socrates, a purported record of the speech Socrates gave at his trial; Phaedo, a description of the last conversation between Socrates and his disciples before his execution; The Symposium, a dialogue over the nature of love; and The Republic, widely regarded as Plato's most important work, a long dialogue describing the ideal government.

Aristotle of Stagira is widely considered to be one of the most important and influential philosophical thinkers of all time.  The first sentence of his Metaphysics reads: "All men by nature desire to know." He has, therefore, been called the "Father of those who know." His medieval disciple Thomas Aquinas referred to him simply as "the Philosopher". Aristotle was a student at Plato's Academy, and like his teacher, he wrote dialogues, or conversations. However, none of these exist today. The body of writings that have come down to the present probably represents lectures that he delivered at his own school in Athens, the Lyceum. Even from these books, the enormous range of his interests is evident: He explored matters other than those that are today considered philosophical; the extant treatises cover logic, the physical and biological sciences, ethics, politics, and constitutional government. Among Aristotle's most notable works are Politics, Nicomachean Ethics, Poetics, On the Soul, and Rhetoric.

Hellenistic period 

By 338 BC all of the Greek city-states except Sparta had been united by Philip II of Macedon. Philip's son Alexander the Great extended his father's conquests greatly. Athens lost its preeminent status as the leader of Greek culture, and it was replaced temporarily by Alexandria, Egypt.

The city of Alexandria in northern Egypt became, from the 3rd century BC, the outstanding center of Greek culture. It also soon attracted a large Jewish population, making it the largest center for Jewish scholarship in the ancient world. The Septuagint, a Greek translation of the Hebrew Bible was reputed to have been initiated in Alexandria. Philo, a Hellenistic Jewish philosopher, operated out of Alexandria at the turn of the Common Era. In addition, it later became a major focal point for the development of Christian thought. The Musaeum, or Shrine to the Muses, which included the library and school, was founded by Ptolemy I. The institution was from the beginning intended as a great international school and library.  The library, eventually containing more than a half million volumes, was mostly in Greek. It was intended to serve as a repository for every work of classical Greek literature that could be found.

Poetry 

The genre of bucolic poetry was first developed by the poet Theocritus. The Roman Virgil later wrote his Eclogues in this genre. Callimachus, a scholar at the Library of Alexandria, composed the Aetia ("Causes"), a long poem written in four volumes of elegiac couplets describing the legendary origins of obscure customs, festivals, and names, which he probably wrote in several stages over the course of many years in the third century BC. The Aetia was lost during the Middle Ages, but, over the course of the twentieth century, much of it was recovered due to new discoveries of ancient papyri. Scholars initially denigrated it as "second-rate", showing great learning, but lacking true "art". Over the course of the century, scholarly appraisal of it greatly improved, with many scholars now seeing it in a much more positive light. Callimachus also wrote short poems for special occasions and at least one short epic, the Ibis, which was directed against his former pupil Apollonius. He also compiled a prose treatise entitled the Pinakes, in which he catalogued all the major works held in the Library of Alexandria.

The Alexandrian poet Apollonius of Rhodes is best known for his epic poem the Argonautica, which narrates the adventures of Jason and his shipmates the Argonauts on their quest to retrieve the Golden Fleece from the land of Colchis. The poet Aratus wrote the hexameter poem Phaenomena, a poetic rendition of Eudoxus of Cnidus's treatise on the stars written in the fourth century BC.

Drama 

During the Hellenistic period, the Old Comedy of the Classical Era was replaced by New Comedy. The most notable writer of New Comedy was the Athenian playwright Menander. None of Menander's plays have survived to the present day in their complete form, but one play, The Bad-Tempered Man, has survived to the present day in a near-complete form. Most of another play entitled The Girl from Samos and large portions of another five have also survived.

Historiography 

The historian Timaeus was born in Sicily but spent most of his life in Athens. His History, though lost, is significant because of its influence on Polybius. In 38 books it covered the history of Sicily and Italy to the year 264 BC, which is where Polybius begins his work. Timaeus also wrote the Olympionikai, a valuable chronological study of the Olympic Games.

Ancient biography

Ancient biography, or bios, as distinct from modern biography, was a genre of Greek (and Roman) literature interested in describing the goals, achievements, failures, and character of ancient historical persons and whether or not they should be imitated. Authors of ancient bios, such as the works of Nepos and Plutarch's Parallel Lives imitated many of the same sources and techniques of the contemporary historiographies of ancient Greece, notably including the works of Herodotus and Thucydides. There were various forms of ancient biographies, including philosophical biographies that brought out the moral character of their subject (such as Diogenes Laertius's Lives of Eminent Philosophers), literary biographies which discussed the lives of orators and poets (such as Philostratus's Lives of the Sophists), school and reference biographies that offered a short sketch of someone including their ancestry, major events and accomplishments, and death, autobiographies, commentaries and memoirs where the subject presents his own life, and historical/political biography focusing on the lives of those active in the military, among other categories.

Science and mathematics 

Eratosthenes of Alexandria ( 276 BC –  195/194 BC), wrote on astronomy and geography, but his work is known mainly from later summaries. He is credited with being the first person to measure the Earth's circumference. Much that was written by the mathematicians Euclid and Archimedes has been preserved. Euclid is known for his Elements, much of which was drawn from his predecessor Eudoxus of Cnidus. The Elements is a treatise on geometry, and it has exerted a continuing influence on mathematics. From Archimedes several treatises have come down to the present. Among them are Measurement of the Circle, in which he worked out the value of pi; The Method of Mechanical Theorems, on his work in mechanics; The Sand Reckoner; and On Floating Bodies. A manuscript of his works is currently being studied.

Prose fiction 

Very little has survived of prose fiction from the Hellenistic Era. The Milesiaka by Aristides of Miletos was probably written during the second century BC. The Milesiaka itself has not survived to the present day in its complete form, but various references to it have survived. The book established a whole new genre of so-called "Milesian tales," of which The Golden Ass by the later Roman writer Apuleius is a prime example.

The ancient Greek novels Chaereas and Callirhoe by Chariton and Metiochus and Parthenope were probably both written during the late first century BC or early first century AD, during the latter part of the Hellenistic Era. The discovery of several fragments of Lollianos's Phoenician Tale reveal the existence of a genre of ancient Greek picaresque novel.

Roman period 

While the transition from city-state to empire affected philosophy a great deal, shifting the emphasis from political theory to personal ethics, Greek letters continued to flourish both under the Successors (especially the Ptolemies) and under Roman rule. Romans of literary or rhetorical inclination looked to Greek models, and Greek literature of all types continued to be read and produced both by native speakers of Greek and later by Roman authors as well. A notable characteristic of this period was the expansion of literary criticism as a genre, particularly as exemplified by Demetrius, Pseudo-Longinus and Dionysius of Halicarnassus. The New Testament, written by various authors in varying qualities of Koine Greek also hails from this period, the most important works being the Gospels and the Epistles of Saint Paul.

Poetry 

The poet Quintus of Smyrna, who probably lived during the late fourth century AD, wrote Posthomerica, an epic poem narrating the story of the fall of Troy, beginning where the Iliad left off. About the same time and in a similar Homeric style, an unknown poet composed the Blemyomachia, a now fragmentary epic about conflict between Romans and Blemmyes.

The poet Nonnus of Panopolis wrote the Dionysiaca, the longest surviving epic poem from antiquity. He also wrote a poetic paraphrase of The Gospel of John. Nonnus probably lived sometime during the late fourth century AD or early fifth century AD.

Historiography 

The historian Polybius was born about 200 BC. He was brought to Rome as a hostage in 168. In Rome he became a friend of the general Scipio Aemilianus. He probably accompanied the general to Spain and North Africa in the wars against Carthage. He was with Scipio at the destruction of Carthage in 146.

Diodorus Siculus was a Greek historian who lived in the 1st century BC, around the time of Julius Caesar and Augustus. He wrote a universal history, Bibliotheca Historica, in 40 books. Of these, the first five and the 11th through the 20th remain. The first two parts covered history through the early Hellenistic era. The third part takes the story to the beginning of Caesar's wars in Gaul, now France. Dionysius of Halicarnassus lived late in the first century BC. His history of Rome from its origins to the First Punic War (264 to 241 BC) is written from a Roman point of view, but it is carefully researched. He also wrote a number of other treatises, including On Imitation, Commentaries on the Ancient Orators, and On the Arrangement of Words.

The historians Appian of Alexandria and Arrian of Nicomedia both lived in the second century AD. Appian wrote on Rome and its conquests, while Arrian is remembered for his work on the campaigns of Alexander the Great. Arrian served in the Roman army. His book therefore concentrates heavily on the military aspects of Alexander's life. Arrian also wrote a philosophical treatise, the Diatribai, based on the teachings of his mentor Epictetus.

Best known of the late Greek historians to modern readers is Plutarch of Chaeronea, who died about AD 119. His Parallel Lives of great Greek and Roman leaders has been read by every generation since the work was first published. His other surviving work is the Moralia, a collection of essays on ethical, religious, political, physical, and literary topics.

During later times, so-called "commonplace books," usually describing historical anecdotes, became quite popular. Surviving examples of this popular genre include works such as Aulus Gellius's Attic Nights, Athenaeus of Naucratis's Deipnosophistae, and Claudius Aelianus's De Natura Animalium and Varia Historia.

Science and mathematics 

The physician Galen lived during the 2nd century AD. He was a careful student of anatomy, and his works exerted a powerful influence on medicine for the next 1,400 years. Strabo, who died about AD 23, was a geographer and historian. His Historical Sketches in 47 volumes has nearly all been lost. His Geographical Sketches remain as the only existing ancient book covering the whole range of people and countries known to the Greeks and Romans through the time of Augustus. Pausanias, who lived in the 2nd century AD, was also a geographer. His Description of Greece is a travel guide describing the geography and mythic history of Greece during the second century. The book takes the form of a tour of Greece, starting in Athens and ending in Naupactus.

The scientist of the Roman period who had the greatest influence on later generations was undoubtedly the astronomer Ptolemy. He lived during the 2nd century AD, though little is known of his life. His masterpiece, originally entitled The Mathematical Collection, has come to the present under the title Almagest, as it was translated by Arab astronomers with that title. It was Ptolemy who devised a detailed description of an Earth-centered universe, a notion that dominated astronomical thinking for more than 1,300 years. The Ptolemaic view of the universe endured until Copernicus, Galileo, Kepler, and other early modern astronomers replaced it with heliocentrism.

Philosophy 

Epictetus ( 55 AD – 135 AD) was associated with the moral philosophy of the Stoics. His teachings were collected by his pupil Arrian in the Discourses and the Encheiridion (Manual of Study).

Diogenes Laërtius, who lived in the third century AD, wrote Lives and Opinions of Eminent Philosophers, a voluminous collection of biographies of nearly every Greek philosopher who ever lived. Unfortunately, Diogenes Laërtius often fails to cite his sources and many modern historians consider his testimony unreliable. Nonetheless, in spite of this, he remains the only available source on the lives of many early Greek philosophers. His book is not entirely without merit; it does preserve a tremendous wealth of information that otherwise would not have been preserved. His biography of Epicurus, for instance, is of particularly high quality and contains three lengthy letters attributed to Epicurus himself, at least two of which are generally agreed to be authentic.

Another major philosopher of his period was Plotinus. He transformed Plato's philosophy into a school called Neoplatonism. His Enneads had a wide-ranging influence on European thought until at least the seventeenth century. Plotinus's philosophy mainly revolved around the concepts of nous, psyche, and the "One."

After the rise of Christianity, many of the most important philosophers were Christians. The second-century Christian apologist Justin Martyr, who wrote exclusively in Greek, made extensive use of ideas from Greek philosophy, especially Platonism. Origen of Alexandria, the founder of Christian theology, also made extensive use of ideas from Greek philosophy and was even able to hold his own against the pagan philosopher Celsus in his apologetic treatise Contra Celsum.

Prose fiction 

The Roman Period was the time when the majority of extant works of Greek prose fiction were composed. The ancient Greek novels Leucippe and Clitophon by Achilles Tatius and Daphnis and Chloe by Longus were both probably written during the early second century AD. Daphnis and Chloe, by far the most famous of the five surviving ancient Greek romance novels, is a nostalgic tale of two young lovers growing up in an idealized pastoral environment on the Greek island of Lesbos. The Wonders Beyond Thule by Antonius Diogenes may have also been written during the early second century AD, although scholars are unsure of its exact date. The Wonders Beyond Thule has not survived in its complete form, but a very lengthy summary of it written by Photios I of Constantinople has survived. The Ephesian Tale by Xenophon of Ephesus was probably written during the late second century AD.

The satirist Lucian of Samosata lived during the late second century AD. Lucian's works were incredibly popular during antiquity. Over eighty different writings attributed to Lucian have survived to the present day. Almost all of Lucian's works are written in the heavily Atticized dialect of ancient Greek language prevalent among the well-educated at the time. His book The Syrian Goddess, however, was written in a faux-Ionic dialect, deliberately imitating the dialect and style of Herodotus. Lucian's most famous work is the novel A True Story, which some authors have described as the earliest surviving work of science fiction. His dialogue The Lover of Lies contains several of the earliest known ghost stories as well as the earliest known version of "The Sorcerer's Apprentice." His letter The Passing of Peregrinus, a ruthless satire against Christians, contains one of the earliest pagan appraisals of early Christianity.

The Aethiopica by Heliodorus of Emesa was probably written during the third century AD. It tells the story of a young Ethiopian princess named Chariclea, who is estranged from her family and goes on many misadventures across the known world. Of all the ancient Greek novels, the one that attained the greatest level of popularity was the Alexander Romance, a fictionalized account of the exploits of Alexander the Great written in the third century AD. Eighty versions of it have survived in twenty-four different languages, attesting that, during the Middle Ages, the novel was nearly as popular as the Bible. Versions of the Alexander Romance were so commonplace in the fourteenth century that Geoffrey Chaucer wrote that "...every wight that hath discrecioun / Hath herd somwhat or al of [Alexander's] fortune."

Legacy 

Ancient Greek literature has had an enormous impact on western literature as a whole. Ancient Roman authors adopted various styles and motifs from ancient Greek literature. These ideas were later, in turn, adopted by other western European writers and literary critics. Ancient Greek literature especially influenced later Greek literature. For instance, the Greek novels influenced the later work Hero and Leander, written by Musaeus Grammaticus. Ancient Roman writers were acutely aware of the ancient Greek literary legacy and many deliberately emulated the style and formula of Greek classics in their own works. The Roman poet Vergil, for instance, modeled his epic poem the Aeneid on the Iliad and the Odyssey.

During the Middle Ages, ancient Greek literature was largely forgotten in Western Europe. The medieval writer Roger Bacon wrote that "there are not four men in Latin Christendom who are acquainted with the Greek, Hebrew, and Arabic grammars." It was not until the Renaissance that Greek writings were rediscovered by western European scholars. During the Renaissance, Greek began to be taught in western European colleges and universities for the first time, which resulted in western European scholars rediscovering the literature of ancient Greece. The Textus Receptus, the first New Testament printed in the original Greek, was published in 1516 by the Dutch humanist scholar Desiderius Erasmus. Erasmus also published Latin translations of classical Greek texts, including a Latin translation of Hesiod's Works and Days.

The influence of classical Greek literature on modern literature is also evident. Numerous figures from classical literature and mythology appear throughout The Divine Comedy by Dante Alighieri. Plutarch's Lives were a major influence on William Shakespeare and served as the main source behind his tragedies Julius Caesar, Antony and Cleopatra, and Coriolanus. Shakespeare's comedies A Comedy of Errors and The Twelfth Night drew heavily on themes from Graeco-Roman New Comedy. Meanwhile, Shakespeare's tragedy Timon of Athens was inspired by a story written by Lucian and his comedy Pericles, Prince of Tyre was based on an adaptation of the ancient Greek novel Apollonius of Tyre found in John Gower's Confessio Amantis.

John Milton's epic poem Paradise Lost is written using a similar style to the two Homeric epics. It also makes frequent allusions to figures from classical literature and mythology, using them as symbols to convey a Christian message. Lucian's A True Story was part of the inspiration for Jonathan Swift's novel Gulliver's Travels. Bulfinch's Mythology, a book on Greek mythology published in 1867 and aimed at a popular audience, was described by Carl J. Richard as "one of the most popular books ever published in the United States".

George Bernard Shaw's play Pygmalion is a modern, rationalized retelling of the ancient Greek legend of Pygmalion. James Joyce's novel Ulysses, heralded by critics as one of the greatest works of modern literature, is a retelling of Homer's Odyssey set in modern-day Dublin. The mid-twentieth-century British author Mary Renault wrote a number of critically acclaimed novels inspired by ancient Greek literature and mythology, including The Last of the Wine and The King Must Die.

Even in works that do not consciously draw on Graeco-Roman literature, authors often employ concepts and themes originating in ancient Greece. The ideas expressed in Aristotle's Poetics, in particular, have influenced generations of Western writers and literary critics. A Latin translation of an Arabic version of the Poetics by Averroes was available during the Middle Ages. Common Greek literary terms still used today include: catharsis, ethos, anagnorisis, hamartia, hubris, mimesis, mythos, nemesis, and peripeteia.

Notes

References

Further reading

External links

 

 
Greek literature
Ancient Greek culture
Arts in ancient Greece
History of literature
Ancient Greek
Western culture
Literature by language
European literature